Exed Exes is a vertically scrolling shooter that was released in arcades in 1985 by Capcom.

Gameplay 

Exed Exes is a vertically scrolling shooter game.

Development and release 

It was originally published in North America as Savage Bees, licensed to Memetron. It was ported to the Famicom and later included in retrospective compilations. It is included with its original name on the Capcom Generations Volume 3 for Sega Saturn and PlayStation, Capcom Classics Collection of PlayStation 2 and Xbox and Capcom Classics Collection Reloaded for PlayStation Portable. This game has been released for the Wii Virtual Console Arcade in Japan on September 21, 2010, the PAL region on January 7, 2011, and in North America on January 10, 2011.  In 2013, it was released on Capcom Arcade Cabinet for PlayStation 3 and Xbox 360 as Savage Bees.

Reception and legacy 

In Japan, Game Machine listed Exed Exes on their March 15, 1985 issue as being the fifteenth most-popular arcade game at the time. Fan reception for the Famicom version was mixed: readers of Famimaga voted to give Exed Exes a 15.27 out of 30 score. A reviewer of Gamest Mook noted that the insect and skull-themed enemies, the inorganic backgrounds, as well as the mysterious and anxiety-inducing music posed a unique and exciting atmosphere. He also praised the mechanic of turing enemies into collectable fruit items as "the greatest attraction of this work."

Colonel Issue appears as a cameo character in Project X Zone 2 as part of Captain Commando's Solo Unit attack.

Notes

References

External links 

 Exed Exes at GameFAQs
 Exed Exes at Giant Bomb
 Exed Exes at Killer List of Videogames
 Exed Exes at MobyGames

1985 video games
Arcade video games
Capcom games
Cooperative video games
Head-to-head arcade video games
PlayStation Network games
Science fiction video games
Tokuma Shoten games
Vertically scrolling shooters
Virtual Console games
Video games developed in Japan
Video games scored by Tamayo Kawamoto
Xbox 360 Live Arcade games